Jean Sarazin (also Sarrasin or Sarrazin), Latinized Joannes Saracenus (1539–1598) was an abbot of the Benedictine Abbey of St. Vaast, Arras, and the third archbishop of Cambrai.

Life
Sarazin was baptized in Arras on 20 July 1539. He was the son of Antoine Sarazin, a craftsman in the wool trade, and Marie de Poix, an inn-keeper. As a choirboy he came to the attention of the parish priest, who ensured he obtained an education. On 29 May 1556 he entered the Abbey of St Vaast. The abbot, impressed with his abilities, sent him for further studies in Paris and Leuven.

From 1575 Sarazin was the delegate of the abbot of St Vaast in the States of the County of Artois, and in that capacity was involved in negotiations relating to the Pacification of Ghent (1576). In 1577 he became abbot himself. An edition of the works of Prosper of Aquitaine, printed in Douai by Joannes Bogardus in 1577, was dedicated to Abbot Sarazin, as was Antonius Meyer's Ursus, sive de rebus Divi Vedasti Episcopi Atrebatensis (Paris, Charles Roger, 1580), and much later Philippe Bosquier's Le Fouet de l'Académie des Pécheurs (Arras, Guillaume de la Rivière, 1597).

Sarazin was active in bringing about the Union of Arras (1579) which was a first step towards reconciling the Walloon provinces of the Habsburg Netherlands to the government of Philip II of Spain. In 1582 he took part in a delegation from the Southern Netherlands to Philip II. A manuscript account of this mission was written by his successor as abbot of St Vaast, Philippe de Caverel, and was published in 1851 as Relation du voyage et de l'ambassade de Jean Sarrazin en Espagne et en Portugal, edited by Louis de Baecker (Bruges, 1851).

On 6 March 1596 Sarazin was appointed to the archbishopric of Cambrai in succession to Louis de Berlaymont, being consecrated in Brussels by the apostolic nuncio on 15 December 1596.

He died in Brussels on 3 March 1598 and was buried in the Abbey of St Vaast.

Writings
A manuscript volume of Sarazin's sermons (1578–1598) survives in the Bibliothèque Municipale Arras.

References

External links
Philippe de Caverel, Relation du voyage et de l'ambassade de Jean Sarazin en Espagne et en Portugal (Arras, 1860).

1536 births
1598 deaths
People from Arras
Benedictine abbots
Archbishops of Cambrai